Mörtschach is a town in the district of Spittal an der Drau in Carinthia in Austria.

Geography
Mörtschach is located between the Großglockner massif, the Lienz Dolomites, and the Schober and Kreuzeck peaks.

References

Cities and towns in Spittal an der Drau District
Goldberg Group
Schober Group